The discography of Jebediah, an Australian alternative rock band, consists of five studio albums, two compilation albums, one video album, two extended plays and fifteen singles.

Albums

Studio albums

Compilation albums

Video albums

Extended plays

Singles

Notes

References

External links
 
 
 

Discographies of Australian artists
Rock music group discographies